Allsvenskan 2009, part of the 2009 Swedish football season, was the 85th Allsvenskan season played. AIK clinched their first Swedish title since 1998.

Participating teams

Overview

League table

Results

Relegation play-offs

Djurgården won 3–2 on aggregate.

Top scorers 
As of 2 November 2009

References

External links 

 Official website 

Allsvenskan seasons
Swed
Swed
1